Joe James Powell (born 30 October 1998) is an English professional footballer who plays as a midfielder for League One club Burton Albion

Career

Powell was raised in Canning Town and joined West Ham United at the age of eight. He signed his first professional contract with the club in January 2015, and signed a renewed three-year deal in May 2016.

On 26 September 2018, Powell made his first team debut in an 8–0 victory in the EFL Cup against Macclesfield Town at the London Stadium, in which fellow debutants Conor Coventry and Grady Diangana also featured. In January 2019, Powell joined Northampton Town on loan until the end of the 2018–19 season.

After returning from loan with Northampton, in May 2019, Powell signed a one-year extension to his contract.

Burton Albion
He signed for Burton Albion on 14 January 2020 on a two-and-a-half-year deal.

Powell agreed a new two-year contract in July 2022.

Personal life
Powell's brother, Jack, is also a professional footballer.

Career statistics

References

Living people
1998 births
Footballers from Canning Town
Association football midfielders
West Ham United F.C. players
English footballers
Northampton Town F.C. players
English Football League players
Burton Albion F.C. players